Valencia, officially the City of Valencia, is a 2nd class component city in the province of Bukidnon, Philippines. According to the 2020 census, it has a population of 216,546 people.

Valencia attained its city status after the ratification of Republic Act No. 8985 on January 12, 2001. The city is the most populous among all cities and municipalities, and the 6th largest in terms of area in the province of Bukidnon. It is also the most populous inland/landlocked city in Mindanao. It is the third largest city in Northern Mindanao in terms of population, after Cagayan de Oro and Iligan respectively. The city serves as the center of trade and commerce in the province of Bukidnon.

History

Origins
The territory that now comprises the city of Valencia is combined from thirteen barangays of Malaybalay.

The earliest inhabitants in the area, presently comprising part of the Poblacion, were Bukidnon natives who founded a settlement along the banks of Pulangi River and the confluence of the dumanggas River. The pioneers were led by Darwin Dumanggas Manangkila together with the families of the Binalhays, Laugas, Dongogans, Gua-ans, Lanayans, and the Arenzos. The first site of the settlement was a sitio named "Panglibatuhan" because the area was thickly forested by tree species called by the natives as "Malibato trees".

In 1911, a one-room barrio school was opened, and its first teacher was the late Leon Galorport. The school site is approximately the present location of the Poblacion Barangay High School. Galorport, who came from his hometown, Valencia, Bohol named the school "Valencia School". When the sitio became a barrio of Malaybalay, the residents agreed to name it "Valencia". Finally, when the southern portion of Malaybalay was separated as a new municipality, the petitioners agreed to name the municipality as "Valencia". However, the use of the name "Valencia" is already seen in Spanish documents in 1893 or even earlier which places it under the jurisdiction of Linabo or Sevilla (now Mailag) in the Province of Misamis.

The rich natural resources found in the territory eventually attracted Christian settlers from the highly populated coastal areas of Mindanao, Visayas and Luzon islands.

Political birth
The prime mover in the creation of Valencia as a municipality was Teodoro Pepito, who spearheaded a petition by the residents of barrio Valencia and neighboring barrios to convert the territory into a full-fledged municipality. The petition was forwarded to the Provincial Board of the Bukidnon province for consideration. The Provincial Board passed a resolution approving the creation of the Municipality of Valencia and forwarded the same to the Office of the President of the Philippines.

By virtue of the provisions of Executive Order No. 360, the municipality of Valencia was formally born on October 11, 1959. The barrios of Bagontaas, Cawayanon, Guinoyuran, Laligan, Lilingayon, Lumbayao, Lurugan, Maapag, Mailag, San Isidro, Sugod, Tongantongan, and Valencia, together with their respective sittios, were separated from then the Municipality of Malaybalay to form the Municipality of Valencia. Later on, some sitios of the original barrios became regular barangays, resulting to the present 31 barangays of Valencia City.

On August 10, 1960, Teodoro N. Pepito and Ernesto Garcia were appointed by President Carlos P. Garcia as Mayor and Vice-Mayor of the municipality, respectively. On May 19, 1961, Pepito's and Garcia's appointments were extended by President Garcia. Upon the election of President Diosdado Macapagal in November 1961, President Garcia's appointees were recalled; President Macapagal then after appointed Lucilo Alkuino as the new ad interim Mayor and Solomon Gao-ay as the new ad interim Vice-Mayor. These appointments were also extended by Macapagal on June 6, 1962, and lasted until the first general elections were held in 1963. Thus, between 1962 and 1963, two sets of municipal officials have served the municipality of Valencia—albeit one set was acting in a de facto capacity. The controversy between the two different appointments was brought to court and later, eventually reached the Supreme Court.  In a decision dated May 31, 1965, two years after the first general election was held, the said high court declared, in a quo warranto petition, that Pepito's and Garcia's tenure after Macapagal's appointment were not legally recognized.

During the regular local election in November 1963, Pepito won and became the first elected mayor, with Ernesto Garcia as the vice mayor. Mayor Pepito was re-elected in 1967 and again in 1971. However, before his term expired in 1975, martial law was declared by President Ferdinand Marcos in 1972 and elections for local officials were suspended. Mayor Pepito continued to hold office as mayor until 1978, when he retired from government service. The vice mayor, Absalon Catarata, succeeded as municipal mayor until 1979, when President Ferdinand Marcos appointed Santiago Dablio as acting mayor of Valencia.

In 1980 local elections, Absalon Catarata was elected municipal mayor, with Romulo Makalood as vice mayor together with all the councilors in the opposition ticket. In February 1986, the People Power Revolution in Manila took place and Corazon Aquino became the President of the Republic.

During the campaign for the approval of the new constitution, the municipal government under the leadership of Absalon Catarata wholeheartedly supported it. In January 1988, Catarata was re-elected as mayor and his running mate, Berthobal Ancheta was elected as vice mayor together with seven councilors under his party. Months later, he was elected president of the Bukidnon Mayors League and similarly as president of the Mayor's League of Region X.

On the evening of April 21, 1988, Absalon Catarata was fatally shot by an unknown assassin in front of his residence while waiting for his service vehicle which would have fetched him to an evening program at the town plaza. After his death, Vice Mayor Berthobal Ancheta became the municipal mayor, and Afrodisia Catarata, the wife of then Mayor, was appointed member of the Sangguniang Bayan. In the synchronized elections of 1990, Mayor Berthobal Ancheta was re-elected while Afrodisia Catarata was elected as vice mayor up to June 2001.

Cityhood

By virtue of Republic No. Act 8985, the Municipality of Valencia was converted into a component city known as the City of Valencia on act converting the municipality of Valencia on January 12, 2001. In 2001 elections, Jose Galario Jr., former Chief of Police of the city was elected as City Mayor; while the son of then Mayor, Absalon Catarata and former Vice Mayor Afrodisia Catarata was also elected as the city's vice mayor in the person of Leandro Jose Catarata. During the 2004 local elections, both the incumbent mayor and vice mayor run for the position of city mayor. Jose Galario Jr. emerged as the winning candidate together with Benjamin Verano as vice mayor.

In the 2007 elections, incumbent Mayor Jose Galario Jr. lost to his rival, Leandro Jose Catarata for city mayor. Benjamin Verano was re-elected as vice mayor of the city. In the 2010 general elections, incumbent Leandro Jose Catarata was reelected for a second term; while Benjamin Verano Sr., Catarata's running mate, won the vice mayoralty position of the City of Valencia. However early in 2010, Verano died at office and was replaced by Azucena Huervas, the president of Valencia's Association of Barangay Captains.

On June 9, 2014, Vice Mayor Azucena Huervas assumed the mayorship of the city after the conviction of Mayor Galario for violating the Anti-graft and Corrupt practices Act (RA 3019) in relation to his order transferring Ruth P. Piano from Budget Office to a non-existing office of City Liaison Officer.

On the May 9, 2016 elections, Mayor Azucena P. Huervas was elected by the people of Valencia against her rivals, Amie G. Galario, Renato Centillas, and Leandro Jose H. Catarata. She was also re-elected in the 2019 elections along with her runningmate Dr. Policarpo P. Murillo IV as Vice-Mayor.

Geography
Valencia City is located in the central part of the Province of Bukidnon. It is bounded on the north by the municipality of Lantapan and Malaybalay City; on the east by the municipality of San Fernando; on the west and southwest by the municipalities of Pangantucan and Talakag; and on the south by the municipalities of Maramag and Quezon.

From its core, which is the Poblacion, the city is 27 kilometers from the provincial capital of Malaybalay City and 118 kilometers from the regional center of Cagayan de Oro. The means of transportation is by bus and private vehicles and covers approximately two to three hours ride.

The relative distance of the barangay from the city proper varies: four barangays are more or less 5 kilometers away, 20 barangays are 6 to 15 kilometers away, while the remaining seven barangays considered as the most interior, are situated 16 kilometers or more from the city proper.

There are no seaports in the city because the place is landlocked. The nearest airports and seaports are in Cagayan de Oro and Davao City.

Topography
The city's topography is characterized as flat to undulating hills with extensive plateaus and mountainous areas and cliffs on both eastern and western portions bounding the municipality of San Fernando on the east and the municipality of Talakag on the west. Its highest point is Mount Kalatungan in the Kalatungan Mountain Range rising above 1,000 meters and above 50 percent slopes. These cover 25.72 percent of the total city area and major portions of Barangay of Lourdes, Guinoyuran and Lilingayon.

Elevation
The city's average elevation is 300 meters above sea level. Elevation above 1,000 meters has a bigger area coverage with 28.93 percent of the total city area or 18,262.79 hectares, while elevation below 300 meters covers only 7.0 percent of total city area or 4,419.78 hectares. Elevation ranges from 300 to 500 meters cover an area of 27,591.10 hectares or 43.70 percent of the total city area. Five hundred to 1,000 meter elevation covers an area of 18,262.79 hectares or 28.93 percent of total city area.

Slope
The area distribution of slope of the city are categorized into: level to gently sloping having a slope range of 0-3 percent covering an area of 6,962.53 hectares or 11.02 percent of the total city area; gently sloping to undulating having a slope range of 3-8 percent covering an area of 18,914.79 hectares or 29.96 percent of total city area; undulating to rolling having a slope range of 8-18 percent covering an area of 3,646.33 hectares or 5.78 percent of the total city area; rolling to hilly having a slope range of 18-30 percent with an area coverage of 11,306.28 hectares or 17.92 percent of the total city area; steep hills to mountainous having a slope of 30-50 percent with area coverage of 6,062.53 hectares or 9.60 percent of the total City area and; cliff-like streamline having a slope range of 50 percent above covering an area of 16,233.54 hectares or 25.72 percent of the total area.

Geology and soil type

Valencia City is underlain by three distinct geologic formations. Volcanic rocks believed to be of pliocene-quaternary age underlie the areas west of Pulangi River. The areas east of the broad plains in Valencia City are underlain by stratified sequence of clastic sedimentary rocks and limestone. Alluvial deposits are unconsolidated detrital materials transformed from higher landforms.

The city generally has clay soil with Adtuyon clay covering 27.89 percent of the total city area suitable for annual cultivated crops and pastures. These are found in all parts of Colonia, Mailag, Bagontaas, Barobo and San Carlos. Maapag clay ranked second with 26.86 percent and covers the whole of San Isidro, Sinayawan, Mabuhay, and Catumbalon and large portions of Vintar, Tongantongan, Maapag and Batangan. Irrigated rice is suitable in these areas. Macolod clay ranked third with 17.51 percent and are generally suited for forest plantation of exotic species. Kidapawan clay loam and undifferentiated mountains soil followed and occupy a combined area of 17.70 percent located within Lilingayon. These areas are also suitable for production forest of native species. Other soil types are San Manuel clay loam (5.31%), La Castellana clay (3.41%), Adtuyon clay stony phase (0.83%), and Mailag clay loam. These types of soil are suitable for annual cultivated crops except for the cliffs along Pulangi River within Poblacion and Lumbo which are not suitable for any land use.

Climate

Barangays
Valencia City is politically subdivided into 31 barangays.

Poblacion and adjacent areas

Poblacion and its surroundings hold importance in the city, serving as the venue of everyday life in and near the urban center. Due to its large urban population and area, there are informal and unofficial sectors which hold cultural, social, and economic significance to the city. These areas are also referred for transportation means when riding within and from the Poblacion. Some of the sectors/areas in the urban center include:

 Balite – a concentration of residences at the northern part of the Poblacion. Named after the large tree that once stood there.
 Barok – located on the western end of Laviña Ave. Valencia City Farmer's Market, several commercial establishment and residential areas are found here.
 Cabanuangan – areas on the upper part of Poblacion, dominated by sugarcane fields and some residences.
 Centro – the business center of the city from the core area of the Poblacion extending up to the boundary of Barangay Poblacion to the south stretching Sayre Highway.
 Hagkol – a commercial-residential area north of Poblacion stretching the Sayre Highway. Several food stores and shops, tertiary schools, auto shops and stores, hotels, residential villages, and fuel stations are found at Hagkol.
 Hindangon – area on the northwestern part of Poblacion after Juanilla Village along Hagkol. Areas are mostly residential and diversified agricultural fields.
 Kawayanon – an urban sitio in the lower part of Barangay Lumbo bounding Barangay Poblacion.
 La-uyan – residential area in the western bank of Pulangi river near the Panlibatuhan creek.
 Malingon, Bagontaas – currently the northernmost urban expansion of the city which is part of Barangay Bagontaas. Some commercial establishments, schools, a village, Toyota Valencia, Valencia Integrated Transport Terminal Complex, and the future Robinsons Place Valencia are located in the said area.
 Petisyon – a rural hill in the westernmost side of Poblacion.
 Santa Cruz – upper portion of the Poblacion along Guinoyuran road near the boundary of Brgys. Barobo and Poblacion. Sparse residences and agricultural fields and a chapel is present in the area.
 Slaughter – concentration of residences on the southern slope and lower areas of a hill where the City Hall is located. Named after the Abattoir or "Slaughter House" which is located in the area.
 Tabuk-Tulay – literally means "to cross the bridge", after vehicles passing eastside the Pulangi or Batangan Bridges from the Poblacion. This term also colloquially include most parts of Batangan. Fuel stations, residential villages, auto shops, several commercial stand and rice mills are found in the area.
 Upper Lumbo (Centro Lumbo) – comprising the residential areas and villages in the upper portion of Barangay Lumbo.
 Upland – concentration of residences south of Centro covering some parts of Purok 3 and Purok 3-B of Poblacion.

Other places in the urban area of the city are referred by their building/establishment names, streets, and Purok.

Demographics

In addition, Valencia's Barangay Poblacion is the largest barangay in the province and third largest in the region according to population.

 Immigration of Christian settlers to the area started in the middle 1930s. During the Second World War, the continued migration of Christian settlers further increased the population of the area from 13,898 in 1960 to 64,541 in 1975. The population grew to 181,556 in 2010.

Religion

The city has several sects, namely: Seventh-Day Adventist Church, Church of Christ of Latter-Day Saints, Jehovah's Witnesses, Iglesia Ni Cristo, United Church of Christ in the Philippines, Iglesia sa Dios Espiritu Santo, United Methodist Church, several Baptist and Pentecostal congregations, and many others. Valencia also has 5 Islamic mosques around the city.

There are eight Roman Catholic Parishes in the city:

The parishes are under the pastoral administration of Roman Catholic Diocese of Malaybalay.

Economy

Commerce and trade

Valencia City is the center of trade and commerce in Bukidnon due to its central location in the heart of Mindanao and its rapid economic growth. The city is noted for its Valencia Rice, a variety of rice.

Some of the prominent retail stores in the city include Alkuino Emporium, Fiesta Shopping Center, Gaisano Valencia, NVM Mall, Puregold, Plaza Villahermosa, Roy Plaza, Robinsons Supermarket, Trendline, and Unitop. Soon-to-open include such stores as NVM Mall-Guinoyuran Road and Robinsons Place Valencia, the second Robinsons Place brand in Northern Mindanao after Iligan. Commercial establishments owned by Maranao, Chinese, and Korean immigrants are also found in the city.

The city has ample outlets for shopping. Some of the famous known brands include Jollibee, Chowking, Greenwich, McDonald's, Red Ribbon, Goldilocks, 7-Eleven, Penshoppe, Citi Hardware, Rough Rider Jeans, Yamaha, Mitsubishi, Toyota and Honda.

Commercial activities are centered on the Poblacion, particularly at the locally termed "Centro" (Downtown). Several retail stores, banks, and commercial establishments are located in this area of Poblacion. Aside from the Centro proper, there are some commercial establishments at Hagkol, on the north portion of Poblacion. It is a result of northward urban expansion of the city. Famous motorbike and vehicle retailers, hotels, schools, hospitals and cafes are located at the Hagkol area.

Valencia City has two functional public markets:
Valencia City Public Market  – located at the commercial center of the city, along G. Laviña Avenue. It serves as the central market of the population.
Valencia Farmer's Market – it is found along Guinoyuran Road. Located in the upper part of Poblacion, it serves as the landing area of agricultural and aquatic products from neighboring towns and provinces. It is near to the proposed second branch of NVM Mall.

Of the 52 banks actively serving region of Bukidnon, 20 banks (about 40% of the province) are located in Valencia City. Nine of the ten largest universal/commercial banks in the country serve the city (except Unionbank). Other banks include Veterans Bank, One Network Bank, Asian United Bank, PSBank, Bukidnon Cooperative Bank, Enterprise Bank, Dumaguete City Development Bank, Rizal Microbank, EastWest Rural Bank, Bank of Makati and Banco Dipolog.

During the year 2013, the city had a total generated income of Php 667,728,494. This has continued to surpass 600,000,000 in the following years.

Agriculture 
The city has a total land area of 63,126 hectares. 35,321.74 hectares or 55.95% of this is the total agricultural area that is suitable for crop production. This illustrates that the city is agricultural-based; people depend on much of their source of income through farming, livestock, and poultry. Valencia is nicknamed as the City of Golden Harvest because of its vast rice plains along the barangays north and east of Pulangi River. Valencia's clay-rich, soil which is highly irrigated and favourable to climatic condition, is very conducive for crop production.

Government

City administration
The city is executively administered by the mayor together with vice mayor. The legislative body comprises the members of the Sangguniang Panlungsod which serves as the city council. The mayor is the local chief executive officer of the city and exercises control and supervision over all local administrative offices; while the Sangguniang Panlungsod acts as the legislative body of the city as mandated by the Local Government Code of the Philippines.

List of former mayors
Municipal Mayors from 1961 until 2001:
 Teodoro N. Pepito 1959–1961, 1964–1977
 Lucilo Alkuino  1962–1963
 Absalon P. Catarata  1977–1979, 1980–1988
 Santiago V. Dablio  1979–1980
 Berthobal R. Ancheta 1988–2001

City Mayors from 2001 to present:
 Jose M. Galario Jr. 2001–2007, 2013–2014
 Leandro Jose H. Catarata 2007–2013
 Azucena P. Huervas  2014–present

Notes

  Teodoro N. Pepito was appointed by President Carlos P. Garcia in 1959 until 1961; continued occupying the mayoral seat from 1962 to 1963 in a de facto capacity. He was elected in 1964 and served for another two consecutive terms plus a hold over term due to Martial law.
  Lucilo Alkuino was appointed by President Diosdado P. Macapagal in 1962.
  Absalon P. Catarata succeeded the office upon Teodoro N. Pepito's retirement in 1977. He was elected for two consecutive terms in 1980 and 1988. Catarata died in office upon his assassination on April 21, 1988.
  Santiago V. Dablio was appointed by President Ferdinand E. Marcos in 1979.
  Azucena P. Huervas succeeded Galario's office after the latter was found guilty of violating the Anti-Graft and Corrupt Practices Act in June 2014.

Tourism

Valencia has several tourist destinations and events as tourist attractions:

Lake Apo Lake Apo is a crater lake in Barangay Guinoyoran. Lake Apo was awarded the cleanest inland body of water in Northern Mindanao Region in the late 1990s.

Kasanayan Cave Kasanayan Cave is located six kilometers from Sitio Tungan-tungan, Barangay San Vicente. The cave has several huge stalactites and are found 400 meters deep from the cave's mouth. The cave also has a river inside it.

Waterfalls
 Malingon Falls in MVC, Mt Nebo
 Alamay Falls and Kimatahay Falls in Lilingayon.

Festivals and events

 The Valencia City Parochial Fiesta, organized by the San Agustin Parish, in collaboration with private sectors and Local Government Unit, is a Roman Catholic celebration of the feast of St. Augustine. It is celebrated every August 28, co-celebrating the feast day with Cagayan de Oro.
 The City Charter Day (Golden Harvest Festival) is a celebration commemorating the cityhood of Valencia. It is held annually every January 6 and is organized by the Local Government Unit of Valencia.
 The Panlalawaig Ta Pulangui Festival is the celebration of the waters of Pulangi River, through a fluvial parade. It is celebrated in honor of the people of Valencia, the river that nourishes the land, and the bamboo raft that strengthened the bond of the land to its people. The festival is a four-day affair that ends every second Saturday of January in celebration of its City Charter, homage to its founders and as a tribute to its hardworking people.

Infrastructure

Transportation

Valencia City is readily accessible by land. There are two functional transport terminals in the city.

Jeepneys from nearby municipalities and barangays, and single motorcycles are available at Valencia City Public Transport Terminal (Old Terminal), located at Poblacion. Public utility vehicles in the Old terminal are available for travel to the municipalities of Kadingilan, Kalilangan, Kibawe, Malaybalay City, Maramag, Quezon, San Fernando, and Wao.

Buses from Cagayan de Oro, General Santos and Davao City are housed in the Integrated Transportation Terminal Complex located at Barangay Bagontaas, approximately three kilometers north from Poblacion. Pabama Transport, Rural Transit and Tours, and Super 5 serves the city with their regional routes. There are also numerous provincial buses serving the city.

Tricycles (locally Motorelas) and private vehicles facilitate the movement of people and goods to and from all places in the city. Traveling from Poblacion is mainly by land through all kinds of vehicles.

Major thoroughfares in the city include Sayre Highway, G. Laviña Avenue (Guinoyuran Road in extension), and Kapalong-Talaingod-Valencia Road.

Traffic in Poblacion has become a serious problem in the city, especially with the major thoroughfares. To reduce congestion of traffic in the city center, Valencia By-pass Road is under construction with its junction in Barangay Mailag. The road will have its other end at Musuan, Maramag, Bukidnon. The City Government also implemented a one-way traffic scheme on the whole stretch of Quezon and Mabini Street. The strict implementation of traffic rules is also observed to promote road safety and order.

Common traffic choke points, which all intersects Sayre Highway, are the following: Catarata Street junction, G. Laviña Avenue junction, and Batangan Bridge junction (Kapalong-Talaingod-Valencia Road).

Parks and venues

Valencia has some event centers which allow the city to host many provincial and even regional gatherings, including the Valencia City Gymnasium, SAIT Gymnasium, City Oval Grounds, Bukidnon Football Training Center, CAP Auditorium and many others. It has only one public park, which is the Plaza Rizal.

Utilities
The water system of the city is administered by the Valencia City Water District that serves five barangays, namely Poblacion, Lumbo, Bagontaas and Mailag. 29 Barangays enjoy electricity supplied by the First Bukidnon Electric Cooperative. One Barangay enjoys power supply by Bukidnon Second Electric Cooperative.

Communication
Telecommunication services are primarily offered by telephone companies such as Philcom–PLDT and Sotelco, and mobile services by Smart Communications, Globe Telecom, and Sun Cellular. Internet services are also offered by Philcom–PLDT, Smart Communications, and Globe Telecom.

Healthcare
 Abella Midway Hospital
 Adventist Medical Center - Valencia City, Inc.
 Esther Hospital
 German Doctors Hospital
 Laviña General Hospital
 Medidas Medical Center
 Valencia Medical Hospital
 Valencia Polymedic General Hospital, Inc.

Education

Colleges
Valencia City has several colleges:

Several students are enrolled in studies at Central Mindanao University, part of the Municipality of Maramag, approximately 7 kilometers from the city proper.

Primary and secondary schools

Private primary and secondary schools:

Almost every barangay has a public primary school, the largest of which is Valencia City Central School located in Barangay Poblacion. There are other primary secondary schools in the city. However, public secondary education is primarily offered by Valencia National High School, which is also the largest in the city.

Culture

Valencia City Hymn
Written and composed by songwriter Ellen "mai" D. Estore-Selecios, the Valencia City Hymn was officially enacted on February 3, 2020, by virtue of City Ordinance No. 17-2020. The Ordinance mandates the singing of the hymn in every flag raising ceremony, official public events, sports competitions, civic functions and programs and other related ceremonies within the jurisdiction of the City of Valencia.

Media
Free-to-air television broadcasts are provided by ABS-CBN and GMA Network through their relay broadcast towers located at Mount Kitanglad in nearby Malaybalay City and Myx will transmitter located in the city. Cable television is available through Parasat Cable TV and Valencia Cable TV; while satellite cable are primarily provided by G Sat, Sky Direct and Cignal Digital TV. Radio broadcasts are primarily provided by FM frequency stations such as 90.5 OV FM (Hypersonic Broadcasting Center), 91.3 Infinite Radio Valencia (St. Jude Thaddeus Institute of Technology), 92.1 Radyo Abante (Iddes Broadcast Group), 92.9 Wild FM (UM Broadcasting Network), 93.7 T Radio Valencia (ELT-ADZ Communication Services), 94.5 DABIGC Radio (Prime Broadcasting Network), 96.1 Energy FM Valencia (Ultrasonic Broadcasting System), Hope Radio 96.9 Valencia (Hope Channel Philippines), 97.7 Win Radio (ZimZam Management), Gold FM 98.5 (Kalayaan Broadcasting System), 99.3 Mano-Mano Radio (Kaissar Broadcasting Network), DXRC 100.1 Radyo Commando Valencia (Valencia Community Broadcasting Company), 102.5 Radyo Bandera Valencia (Bandera News Philippines), Mellow Touch 103.3 (FBS Radio Network), 104.1 Yes The Best (Pacific Broadcasting Systems), 104.9 Radyo Kalilan Valencia (Nutriskwela Community Radio) and 105.7 Brigada News FM Valencia (Brigada Mass Media Corporation), 106.3 Love Radio Malaybalay (Manila Broadcasting Company, which is also receivable also in Valencia) and AM stations such as DXDB Radyo Totoo 594 AM (Catholic Media Network, the oldest running radio station in Bukidnon), DXMB RMN Malaybalay 648 (Radio Mindanao Network) DXMV News and Public Affairs 1134 Valencia (UM Broadcasting Network) and 1386 Hope Radio Valencia (Hope Channel Philippines). National circulating newspapers such as the Philippine Daily Inquirer, The Philippine Star, Manila Bulletin and Kastigador Balita Mindanao, are available in the city. Several local Mindanao newspapers and tabloid sheets are also circulated locally.

Notable personalities

 Mario Fernandez – a multi-medalist national boxer.

References

External links

 
 [ Philippine Standard Geographic Code]
 Philippine Census Information

 
1961 establishments in the Philippines
Cities in Bukidnon
Component cities in the Philippines
Populated places established in 1961
Populated places on the Rio Grande de Mindanao
Establishments by Philippine executive order